Saros cycle series 126 for lunar eclipses occurs at the moon's ascending node, 18 years 11 and 1/3 days. It contains 70 member events, with 14 total eclipses, starting in 1769 and ending in 2003.

This lunar saros is linked to Solar Saros 133.

List

See also 
 List of lunar eclipses
 List of Saros series for lunar eclipses

Notes

External links 
 www.hermit.org: Saros 126

Lunar saros series